The FIFA World Cup, sometimes called the Football World Cup  but usually referred to simply as the World Cup, is an international association football competition contested by the men's national teams of the members of Fédération Internationale de Football Association (FIFA), the sport's global governing body. The championship has been awarded every four years since the first tournament in 1930, except in 1942 and 1946, due to World War II.

The tournament consists of two parts, the qualification phase and the final phase (officially called the World Cup Finals). The qualification phase, which currently take place over the three years preceding the Finals, is used to determine which teams qualify for the Finals. The current format of the Finals involves 32 teams competing for the title, at venues within the host nation (or nations) over a period of about a month. The World Cup Finals is the most widely viewed sporting event in the world, with an estimated 715.1 million people watching the 2006 tournament final.

Egypt have qualified for the FIFA World Cup on three occasions, in 1934, 1990 and 2018. With 2 draws and 5 losses, Egypt has never won a match in the World Cup finals.
In 1934 Egypt became the first Arab and African team to play in the World Cup. When they qualified again in 1990, they became the team with the longest-ever gap between two FIFA World Cup matches: 56 years and 16 days had passed. This was surpassed in 2022 by the qualification of Wales for the first time in 64 years.

FIFA World Cup record

Overview of matches

Italy 1934

First round

Italy 1990

Group stage 
Group F

Group F, featured the Netherlands, England, the Republic of Ireland and Egypt. In the six group games, no team managed to score more than once in a match. England beat Egypt 1–0, thanks to a 58th-minute goal from Mark Wright – and that was enough to win the group.

The Republic of Ireland and the Netherlands finished with identical records. With both teams assured of progressing, they were split by the drawing of lots to determine second and third place.
---

Russia 2018

Group stage 
Group A

Russia vs Egypt

Saudi Arabia vs Egypt

Record players
Due to the long time spans between Egypt's World Cup participations, no player was able to play more than one tournament. 22 players share the record for most World Cup appearances for Egypt: Ten players from the 1990 FIFA World Cup, among them twin brothers Hossam and Ibrahim Hassan, and twelve players from 2018. The team of 1934 was only able to play one match because of a different tournament format.

An Egyptian player with a notable record is goalkeeper Essam El-Hadary. On 25 June 2018, he became the oldest player ever to appear in a World Cup match with 45 years and 5 months. He saved a penalty in the first half of the match against Saudi Arabia, but ultimately Egypt lost 1–2.

Top goalscorers
Scoring twice at Egypt's first-ever World Cup match, their 2–4 defeat against Hungary, made Abdulrahman Fawzi the only African goalscorer at a FIFA World Cup finals for decades. It took 84 years for another Egyptian, Mohamed Salah, to equal his tally.

World Cup qualifications record

World Cup qualifications games

FIFA World Cup URUGUAY 1930 

The Egyptian Football association declined the invitation handed to it by FIFA because of the cost of the far trip to Uruguay to participate in the  FIFA World Cup URUGUAY 1930

FIFA World Cup ITALY 1934 

Group 12

The Palestine football team consisted of nine British footballers, six Jewish footballers and one Arab footballer. FIFA states in reference to the 1930s Palestine Mandate team that the 'Palestine team' that had participated in previous competitions in the 1930s was actually the forerunner of today's Israel team and as such bears no relation to the national team of the Palestinian authority although there were  no state named Israel yet . However, the region currently known as Palestine is considered "one of the first Asian teams to compete in the FIFA World Cup qualifiers".

11–2 on aggregate; Egypt qualified.

FIFA World Cup FRANCE 1938 

Group 4
Egypt were to play Romania in December 1937 however Egypt refused to play Romania due a Financial Problems 
Another Story says Egypt refused to play Romania during the Ramadan month, Egyptian officials had argued it was "impossible" to play football during that time period. Egyptian officials went on to invite Austrian club side First Vienna FC to Egypt to participate in a friendly game against the national team during the holy month. As a result, Egypt were withdrawn from the competition by FIFA, so Romania qualified automatically.

FIFA World Cup BRAZIL 1950 

Egypt did not participate in this version of the FIFA World Cup for no clear reasons

FIFA World Cup Switzerland 1954 

Group 9

EGYPT didn't qualify

FIFA World Cup SWEDEN 1958 

Africa and Asia
CAF / AFC First Round
Group 3

Cyprus withdrew, so Egypt advanced to the Second Round automatically.

CAF / AFC Second Round

Indonesia withdrew after FIFA rejected their request to play against Israel on neutral ground.
Israel advanced to the Final Round automatically.  Egypt withdrew, so Sudan advanced to the Final Round automatically.

FIFA World Cup CHILE 1962 

CAF First Round
Group 1

United Arab Republic and Sudan both withdrew as FIFA refused to allow them to rearrange their games to avoid the monsoon season.

FIFA World Cup ENGLAND 1966 

Africa First Round
No matches were played because of protests to the allocation of spots. The original group draws were.

Africa Second Round

The second round pairing were scheduled as following.

The winners were to advance to the final round.

FIFA World Cup MEXICO 1970 

Egypt did not participate in this version of the FIFA World Cup due to the postponement of all sports activities after 1967 war

FIFA World Cup GERMANY 1974 

Egypt out of first Round.

FIFA World Cup ARGENTINA 1978 

Egypt advanced to the Second Round.

Egypt advanced to the Third Round.

Egypt advanced to the Final Round.

Egypt out of Final Round.

FIFA World Cup SPAIN 1982 

Egypt advanced to the Second Round, Ghana withdrew.

Egypt advanced to the Third Round, Libya withdrew.

Egypt out of Third Round.

FIFA World Cup MEXICO 1986 

First Round

Egypt advanced to the Second Round.

Second Round

Egypt advanced to the Third Round on penalties.

Third Round

Egypt out of Third Round.

FIFA World Cup ITALY 1990 

Second round
Group B

Final round

Egypt won 1–0 on aggregate and qualified for the 1990 World Cup.

FIFA World Cup USA 1994

References

External links 
Profile at FIFA.com
World Cup Finals Record at FIFA.com
Highlights 1990 FIFA World Cup

 
Countries at the FIFA World Cup